Walsh is a common Irish surname, meaning "Briton" or "foreigner", literally "Welshman" or "Wales", taken to Ireland by soldiers from Britain, namely  Cambro-Norman/Welsh, Cornish and Cumbrian soldiers during and after the Norman invasion of Ireland. It is most common in County Mayo and County Kilkenny. It is the fourth most common surname in Ireland, and the 265th most common in the United States. There are variants including "Walshe", “Welch”, "Welsh", "Brannagh", and the Irish "Breathnach". Walsh is uncommon as a given name. The name is often pronounced "Welsh" in the south and west of the country. In Great Britain, Guppy encountered the name only in Lancashire. It is the surname of the Barons Ormathwaite.

Origins in Ireland

There are several Walsh families in Ireland who have recognized coats of arms. These are the Walshs of Ballykilcaven in County Laois whose motto is "Firm" and their crest is a griffin's head. The Walshs of Castlehale in County Kilkenny have a crest with a swan pierced by an arrow, and their motto is "Pierced but not dead". The Walshs of Carrickmines Castle, County Dublin have a crest with a demi-lion rampant and their motto is "Do not irritate the lions". However, there were Walshs all over Ireland. One theory as to their origin is that they have a common ancestor in 'Walynus' who came to Ireland in the military retinue of Maurice FitzGerald, Lord of Lanstephan and it is from 'Walynus' who the famed Walsh of the Mountains family in County Kilkenny was established. Other sources suggest 'Phillip of Wales' who could have been the same person as 'Walynus' whose son, Howel, gave his name to their stronghold Castle Hoel, which was also known as Castlehale or Castlehowel. Other theories are that the Walshs originated from Pembrokeshire, that they had close ties with the barons of Cornwall or that they descended from Owen Gwynnes, a prince of north Wales.

During the Wars of the Three Kingdoms the Walsh of the Mountains family in Kilkenny took up arms against Oliver Cromwell and as a result, their stronghold of Castlehale was besieged and taken in 1650. The survivors were executed and thrown into a burial pit at the bottom of a hill near the castle. In the nineteenth century, their remains were uncovered during road building near the hill.

Motto 
The Walsh family Motto in Latin is ‘Transfixus sed non mortuus’. Translated to in current English as ‘Pierced but not dead’. Many translations incorrectly translate ‘Transfixus’ to ‘Transfixed’ which is a literal translation. In most coats of arms you will only see the shield, many images omit the ‘Pierced’ or ‘impailed’ swan, which gives the translation greater context and meaning. There are many views on the meaning behind the translation, however, most coats of arms would denote a statement of positivity. Many believe the pierced or impaling is a sign of resilience and strength.

People with the surname
People with the surname include:

A–E
A. D. Walsh, British chemist
Adam Walsh (American football) (1901–1985), American football player and coach
Addie Walsh, soap opera writer
Adrian Walsh (born 1963), Australian philosopher
Alan Walsh (disambiguation)
Andrew Walsh (politician) (1838–1889), American politician and judge
Augie Walsh, baseball player
Benjamin Dann Walsh, American entomologist
Bertram John Walsh (born 1938), American mathematician
Bill Walsh (disambiguation)
Blaine Walsh, Milwaukee Braves and Green Bay Packers announcer
Bradley Walsh, footballer, TV presenter and soap actor
Brendan Walsh, American chef
Brendon Walsh, American stand-up comedian
Brian Walsh (disambiguation)
Carl E. Walsh, economist and professor
Christopher Walsh (disambiguation)
Christy Walsh (disambiguation)
Colin Walsh (disambiguation)
Courtney Walsh, former international cricketer
Craig Walsh (born 1971), American composer
David I. Walsh, Senator and Governor of Massachusetts
David Walsh (disambiguation), multiple people
Ed Walsh (1881–1959), baseball player
Eddie Walsh (disambiguation)
Edmund A. Walsh (1885–1956), Jesuit priest and educator
Edward Walsh (disambiguation)
Eileen Walsh, Irish actress
Ellard A. Walsh, U.S. National Guard and Army officer
Evalyn Walsh, last private owner of the Hope Diamond

F–J
Fintan Patrick Walsh (1894–1963), New Zealand politician and union leader
Frances Walsh (born 1959), screenwriter, film producer, and musician
Frank B. Walsh (1895–1978), Canadian-American ophthalmologist
Hayden Walsh Jr, West Indies cricketer
Holly Walsh, British comedian
Ian Walsh (footballer) (born 1958), Welsh international footballer
J. T. Walsh, American actor
Jack Walsh (disambiguation)
Jake Walsh (born 1995), American baseball player
James Walsh (disambiguation)
Jamie Walsh, rugby league footballer of the 1970s
Jared Walsh, American baseball player
Jeffrey Walsh, Catholic bishop elect of Gaylord, Michigan, U.S.
Jill Paton Walsh (1937–2020), English novelist and children's writer
Jimmy Walsh (baseball outfielder), Irish baseball player
Jim Walsh (disambiguation)
Joan Walsh, journalist
Joan E. Walsh, British numerical analyst
Joe Walsh, American guitarist and rock musician
Joe Walsh (American politician), American politician
Joe Walsh (Irish politician), Irish politician
John Walsh (disambiguation), including people named Jack
Joseph L. Walsh (1895–1973), American mathematician

K–P
Kate Walsh (actress) (born 1967), American actress
Kate Walsh (presenter) (born 1981), British TV presenter
Kay Walsh, an English actress and dancer
Keira Walsh (born 1997), English association football player
Kerri Walsh Jennings (born 1978), American beach volleyball player
Kimberley Walsh, member of British girlband Girls Aloud
Lawrence Walsh (regarding Iran Contra Affair)
Leighton Walsh, DJ better known by the stage name Walshy Fire
Lois Walsh, American Air Force advanced computing researcher
Louis Walsh (born 1952), Irish pop music manager and X Factor judge
Maiara Walsh, American actress
María Elena Walsh, Argentine singer and writer
Mark Walsh (disambiguation)
Martin Walsh (disambiguation)
Marty Walsh, U.S. Secretary of Labor, mayor of Boston, Massachusetts
Mary Walsh (disambiguation)
Matt Walsh (disambiguation)
Maureen Walsh (born 1969), American politician
Maurice Walsh, Irish novelist
Michael Walsh (Medal of Honor), American Medal of Honor recipients
Michaela Walsh (disambiguation)
Mickey Walsh, Irish footballer and football agent
Noel Walsh, Irish Gaelic footballer, administrator, selector, manager and member of the Defence Forces
Norman Walsh, Rhodesian and Zimbabwean air marshal
Orla Walsh, Irish track cyclist 
Pat Walsh (disambiguation)
Patricia Walsh (born 1952), Argentine political activist, daughter of Rodolfo Walsh
Patrick Walsh (disambiguation)
Paul Walsh (disambiguation)
Peter Walsh (disambiguation)
Phil Walsh (Australian footballer), Australian rules football player and coach (murdered in 2015)
Phil Walsh (English footballer), English association footballer
Phil K. Walsh (died 1935), Australian actor and silent film producer

R–Z
Raoul Walsh (1887–1980), American film director
Rhoda Walsh, American bridge player
Richard Walsh (disambiguation)
Robert Walsh (disambiguation)
Rodolfo Walsh (1927–1977), Argentine journalist, writer and political activist, considered the founder of investigative journalism
Roger Walsh, Australian psychiatrist and philosopher
Ruby Walsh, Irish jockey
Sam Walsh (disambiguation)
Samuel Walsh (artist), Irish artist
Samuel P. Walsh, (1902–1961) American educator and politician
Sandy Walsh, Indonesian football player
Sean Walsh (disambiguation)
Seann Walsh, English actor
Shannon Walsh, Canadian filmmaker 
Sheila Walsh (disambiguation)
Stanisława Walasiewicz, aka Stella Walsh, Polish-American track and field athlete
Stephen Walsh (disambiguation), including people named Steve or Steven
Terry Walsh (disambiguation)
Therese Walsh, chief executive and business leader from New Zealand
Tim Walsh (disambiguation)
Thomas Walsh (disambiguation), including people named Tom or Tommy
Tony Walsh (poet), English performance poet
Walt Walsh, baseball player
W. H. Walsh (1913–1986), British philosopher
William Walsh (disambiguation)
Willie Walsh (disambiguation)

Fictional characters
Andie Walsh, from Pretty in Pink
Connor Walsh, in the television series How to Get Away with Murder
Jack Walsh, the character portrayed by Robert De Niro in the film Midnight Run
Maggie Walsh, from Buffy the Vampire Slayer
Mikey Walsh, from The Goonies
Shane Walsh (The Walking Dead), from The Walking Dead
A family of characters in the Beverly Hills, 90210 franchise; see List of Beverly Hills, 90210 characters
 Jim and Cindy Walsh, parents
 Brandon and Brenda Walsh, fraternal twin children
Toni Walsh, from Red Dawn

See also
 Attorney General Walsh (disambiguation)
 General Walsh (disambiguation)
 Judge Walsh (disambiguation)
 Justice Walsh (disambiguation)
 Senator Walsh (disambiguation)
 Walshe (surname)
 Welch (surname)
 Welsh (surname)
 Wallace (surname)

References

External links 
 Walsh Surname DNA Project
 Official Walsh Irish Clan website

Surnames of Irish origin
Anglicised Irish-language surnames
English-language surnames
Surnames of British Isles origin
Ethnonymic surnames